Fréderic José Elie Arlet (born March 10, 1946) is a Haitian-born Venezuelan former footballer and manager. He had 20 appearances for Venezuela between 1964 and 1977.

Sport activity
 
Freddy Elie stood out for his passing ability and speed. He grew up in La Guaira, Venezuela, debuting professionally with Deportivo Galicia, then moving to Deportivo Italia in 1970. 
 
With Deportivo Italia he participated as a central defender in the Little Maracanazo, a match in 1971 in which Deportivo Italia scored a surprise 1–0 upset over Brazilian champion Fluminense FC, a club managed by Mário Zagallo, who was manager of the Brazil national football team when they won the 1970 World Cup a few months earlier.
 
Elie made 20 appearances with the Venezuela national football team between 1964 and 1977.
 
In 1973, Elie was signed by Alianza Lima.

From 1975 to 1980, Elie moved on to play with Tiquire Canarias, Portuguesa F.C., then Lara F.C., before finishing his career in 1981 in Venezuela with the Universidad de Los Andes club.

In 2001 he was the coach of the Unión Atlético Maracaibo.

Honours

He won the Venezuela Championship 3 times with Portuguesa FC.

Club
Portuguesa
 Venezuelan Primera División: 1976, 1977, 1978

References

1946 births
Venezuelan footballers
Venezuela international footballers
Living people
Venezuelan Primera División players
Peruvian Primera División players
Deportivo Italia players
José Gálvez FBC footballers
Club Alianza Lima footballers
Portuguesa F.C. players
Asociación Civil Deportivo Lara players
UA Maracaibo managers
Venezuelan people of Haitian descent
Association football defenders
Venezuelan football managers